Sadanam Puthiya Veettil Balakrishnan popularly known as Sadanam Balakrishnan is an exponent of Kathakali, a form of Indian classical dance, from Kerala, India. He has received several notable awards, including the Sangeet Natak Akademi Award in 2003, Kerala state Kathakali award in 2020, and Kerala Kalamandalam fellowship in 2017. Balakrishnan taught Kathakali at the International Center for Kathakali in Delhi from 1974 to 2006 and became the Principal of Perur Gandhi Seva Sadanam in 1980. He has written four books.

Biography
Puthiya Veettil Balakrishnan was born in 1944 in Taliparamba, Kannur district to A. V. Krishnan and Umayamma. He first studied Kathakali from Kondiveettil Narayanan Nair and later studied at Gandhi Sevasadanam Kathakali Academy under Thekkinkatil Rammuni Nair and Keezhpadam Kumaran Nair for ten years with a Central Government Scholarship. He is specialized in the Kalluvazhi style of Kathakali performance. He joined as a teacher in Kathakali at the International Center for Kathakali in Delhi in 1974, took charge as its Principal and Chief Artiste in 1980 and retired in 2006. After the retirement of Keezpadam Kumaran Nair in 1980, he became the Principal of Perur Gandhi Seva Sadanam. He proved his mettle in all disciplines of Kathakali including acting, choreography, direction and teaching.

Balakrishnan has also written four books. Among the published books, Kathakali is part of a series on the six classical Indian dances, published by Wisdom Tree and another Kathakali: A Practitioner’s Perspective was published by Poorna Publications. Two books are about to publish soon. One is a compilation of 14 Aattakatha texts and other is about his Guru Keezhpadam Kumaran Nair.

Awards and honors
Sangeet Natak Akademi Award 2003
Kerala state Kathakali award 2020
Kerala Kalamandalam fellowship 2017
Kerala Kalamandalam Award 2007
Natyarathanam Kannan Pattali Kathakali Trust's Natyacharya Award 2021
Swathi Thirunal Nadalaya Award 1986
Mookambika Kathakali Vidyalaya Award 2003
Natana Bhaskara Award 2003 from Bharata Kalanjali and Bhaskara
 2006 "Guru Pattikamthodi Smaraka Puraskara" from Gandhi Seva Sadanam Kathakali Academy
Natyakalaratnam and Gold Medal from Mattannur Mahadeva Kshetram &  Mattannur Pancha Vadya Sangham 2007
"Guru Sree" Award from Kaladarpan 2008
Kalamandalam Krishnan Kutty Poduval Smaraka Award 2009 
Dr. K.N.Pisharody Smaraka Award 2010 from K.N. Pisharody Smaraka Kathakali Club
"Nritya Sagaram Award" 2015 from Cleveland Bhairavi Finance Society
First International Center for Kathakali Award 2015 
Gold Medal in the event Mudralaya in London 1990

References

1944 births
Living people
20th-century Indian dancers
Dancers from Kerala
Kathakali exponents
People from Kannur district
Recipients of the Sangeet Natak Akademi Award
Malayali people
Indian male dancers